NGC 908 is an unbarred spiral galaxy in the constellation Cetus. It was discovered in 1786 by William Herschel. This galaxy is 56 million light years away from Earth. It is the main galaxy in the NGC 908 group, which also includes NGC 899, NGC 907, and IC 223.

NGC 908 has vigorous star formation and is a starburst galaxy. The galaxy has a three-arm spiral pattern; two of its arms have peculiar morphology. The galaxy has a bright central bulge. Clusters of young stars and star-forming knots can be seen in the arms. Starburst activity and the peculiar morphology of the galaxy indicate it had a close encounter with another galaxy, although none are visible now.

Two supernovae have been observed in NGC 908, SN 1994ai (Ic type, mag. 17) and SN 2006ce (Ia type, mag. 12.4).

References

External links 

Cetus (constellation)
Unbarred spiral galaxies
Starburst galaxies
0908
09057
00027
-04-06-035